Ole Sørensen (22 September 1883 – 25 February 1958) was a Norwegian sailor who competed in the 1920 Summer Olympics. He was a crew member of the Norwegian boat Eleda, which won the gold medal in the 10 metre class (1907 rating).

References

External links 
 
 

1883 births
1958 deaths
Norwegian male sailors (sport)
Olympic sailors of Norway
Olympic gold medalists for Norway
Olympic medalists in sailing
Medalists at the 1920 Summer Olympics
Sailors at the 1920 Summer Olympics – 10 Metre